Terézia Zakoucs (born Terézia Mukics) ( 1817 – May 2, 1885) was a Hungarian Slovene author.

She was born in Felsőszölnök. She married György Zakoucs. In 1858 she completed her hymnal in the Prekmurje dialect Cantiones Ritkarócziensis. The book contains a number of hymns adapted from the hymnal of János Slejbics in Čepinci.

She died in Ritkarócz (Kétvölgy).

Literature 
 Vilko Novak: Prekmurske rokopisne pesmarice, Jezik in slovstvo 6/7, Slavistično društvo Slovenije 1974.

See also 
 List of Slovene writers and poets in Hungary

Slovenian writers and poets in Hungary
1817 births
1885 deaths